Gerania may refer to:

Gerania (beetle), a genus of beetles in the family Cerambycidae
Gerania, Larissa, a village in Greece
Geraneia, a range of mountains in Greece
Gerania, cranes that could pour Greek fire onto enemy ships and were used by the Byzantine Empire